The Silver Creek Fault is a potentially seismically active, northwest–southeast trending strike-slip fault structure in Santa Clara County, California.

No historic activity of the Silver Creek Fault has been recorded. The City of San José considers the fault to be a rupture hazard only in the foothills but not in the Santa Clara Valley floor.

Research in 2003 suggested that an extension of the Silver Creek Fault may run the entire length of the East Bay, but by 2010 the California Geological Survey's state Fault Activity Map had truncated the Silver Creek Fault south of Fremont.

See also
Richter magnitude scale
Silicon Valley

References

Further reading

External links
Large offset on the Silver Creek Fault

Seismic faults of California
Geology of Santa Clara County, California
Geography of Santa Clara County, California
Strike-slip faults